Miracle on Main Street is a 1939 American drama film directed by Steve Sekely and written by Frederick J. Jackson. The film stars Margo, Walter Abel, William Collier Sr., Jane Darwell, Lyle Talbot and Wynne Gibson. The film was released on December 19, 1939, by Columbia Pictures.

Plot

Cast         
Margo as Maria Porter
Walter Abel as Jim Foreman
William Collier Sr. as Dr. Miles
Jane Darwell as Mrs. Herman
Lyle Talbot as Dick Porter
Wynne Gibson as Sade Blake
Veda Ann Borg as Flo
Pat Flaherty as Detective
George Humbert as Pepito
Jean Brooks as Nina 
Susan Miller as Singer
Willie Best as Duke
Dorothy Devore as Woman in Church
Ottola Nesmith as Welfare worker

References

External links
 

1939 films
American drama films
1939 drama films
Columbia Pictures films
Films directed by Steve Sekely
American black-and-white films
1930s English-language films
1930s American films